The Golden Orphism Book is a Thracian golden artifact consisting of 6 bound sheets with total weight of 100 grams, with a size 5 to 4.5 cm, made of 23.82-karat gold. As the sheets are linked bookwise, it is considered the oldest surviving codex, or book. Its contents are related to Orphism, which existed in the Thracian and Hellenistic world. Illustrations of priests, a horse-rider, a mermaid, a harp and soldiers, as well as writing in Etruscan, hint at burial process of an aristocrat devoted to the cult of Orphism. Found when a tomb was inadvertently opened during construction of a canal in Bulgaria, the book can be seen by the public in the National Historical Museum in Sofia

Notes

See also
Panagyurishte Treasure
Rogozen Treasure
Valchitran Treasure
Lukovit Treasure
Borovo Treasure

Gold objects
Treasure troves in Bulgaria
Ancient Thrace
Ancient art in metal